Bass Otis (July 17, 1784 - November 3, 1861), was an early American artist, inventor, and portrait painter.  He painted hundreds of portraits including many of the best known Americans of his day, and produced the first American lithograph in 1819.

Life and work

Otis was born in East Bridgewater, Massachusetts, the son of Josiah Otis, a physician, and Susanna Orr. As a youth, he may have been apprenticed to a scythe maker, perhaps to a relative. Later he worked as a coach painter, then studied with Gilbert Stuart in Boston about 1805-1808. Otis then moved to New York City, perhaps working as an assistant to painter John Wesley Jarvis. When he moved to Philadelphia, Pennsylvania in 1812, his painting career flourished.
He was elected to the Society of Artists of the United States in 1812, and eight of his portraits were included in the combined exhibition of the Society of Artists and the Pennsylvania Academy of the Fine Arts. He was elected an academician in the Pennsylvania Academy in 1824. One of Otis's most famous early works showed a scene inside a metalworking shop, probably a reflection of his years as an apprentice. In 1813 he married Alice Pierie of Philadelphia, and they had six children. 

Otis patented the perspective protractor in 1815.  With Philadelphia publisher Joseph Delaplaine he began painting portraits for “Delaplaine's Repository of the Lives and Portraits of Distinguished American Characters.” In 1816 Otis painted portraits of Thomas Jefferson, James Madison and Dolley Madison. In total, Otis painted twenty-four portraits for the “Repository,” though only the Jefferson portrait was published before the end of the project in 1818. Some of the remaining portraits were exhibited in Delaplaine’s Philadelphia gallery, which became part of Rubens Peale's New York museum. Otis produced the first American lithograph, which was published in the July 1819 issue of Analectic Magazine, together with an article on the lithographic process.

Otis's notebooks for 1819-26 record over 300 portraits painted, including  portraits of artist John Neagle, the Reverend Shepard Kosciusko Kollock, Victor Marie du Pont, John Greenleaf Whittier, Senator John C. Fremont, and the Reverend James Abercrombie. He painted a famous postmortem portrait of Philadelphia financier Stephen Girard. Other well-known sitters included author James Fenimore Cooper, Thomas Garrett, and U.S. President William Henry Harrison.

He worked mainly in Philadelphia, but also worked in Boston (1837, 1846–58) and in Wilmington, Delaware (1839, 1840s) and in Providence, Rhode Island (1858–61).  His students included Henry Inman, Peter F. Rothermel and John Neagle.

Gallery

References

Further reading
Craven, Wayne. “Bass Otis: A Critical Commentary” pp. 24–30 in Bass Otis: Painter, Portraitist and Engraver. Wilmington: Historical Society of Delaware, 1976.
William Dunlap, A History of the Rise and Progress of the Arts of Design in the United States (1834)
Gordon Hendricks, " 'A Wish to Please, and a Willingness to Be Pleased,' " American Art Journal 2 (1970): 16-29.

Knoles, Thomas. "The Notebook of Bass Otis, Philadelphia Portrait Painter," Proceedings of the American Antiquarian Society 103 (1): 179-253. 1993
John Carpenter McKee, Bass Otis and His Critics, University of Delaware Masters Thesis, 1995.
Philip J. Weimerskirch, "Lithographic Stone in America," Printing History 11 (1989): 2-15.

External links
Smithsonian Institution Research Information Service (SIRIS)

1784 births
1861 deaths
19th-century American painters
American male painters
American portrait painters
Artists from Philadelphia
Artists from Boston
Burials at Lawnview Memorial Park
19th century in Boston
People from East Bridgewater, Massachusetts
19th-century American male artists